Awtano is a member of the Fakaofo island group of Tokelau.

See also
Saumatafanga

References

Islands of Tokelau
Fakaofo